Gustavus "Gus" Cannon (September 12, 1883 or 1884 – October 15, 1979) was an American blues musician who helped to popularize jug bands (such as his own Cannon's Jug Stompers) in the 1920s and 1930s. There is uncertainty about his birth year; his tombstone gives the date as 1874.

Career
Born on a plantation in Red Banks, Mississippi, Cannon moved a hundred miles to Clarksdale, then the home of W. C. Handy, at the age of 12. His musical skills came without training; he taught himself to play a banjo that he made from a frying pan and a raccoon skin. He ran away from home at the age of fifteen and began his career entertaining at sawmills and at levee and railroad camps in the Mississippi Delta around the turn of the century.

While in Clarksdale, Cannon was influenced by two local musicians, Jim Turner and Alec Lee. Turner's fiddle playing in W. C. Handy's band so impressed Cannon that he decided to learn to play the fiddle himself. Lee, a guitarist, taught Cannon his first folk blues, "Po' Boy, Long Ways from Home," and showed him how to use a knife blade as a slide, a technique that Cannon adapted to his banjo playing.

Cannon left Clarksdale around 1907 and soon settled near Memphis, Tennessee, where he played in a jug band led by Jim Guffin. He began playing in Memphis with Jim Jackson. He met the harmonica player Noah Lewis, who introduced him to a young guitar player, Ashley Thompson. Lewis and Thompson later were members of Cannon's Jug Stompers. The three of them formed a band to play at parties and dances. In 1914 Cannon began touring in medicine shows. He supported his family through various jobs, including sharecropping, ditch digging, and yard work, but supplemented his income with music.

Cannon began recording, as Banjo Joe, for Paramount Records in 1927. At that session he was backed by Blind Blake. After the success of the Memphis Jug Band's first records, he quickly assembled a jug band, Cannon's Jug Stompers, featuring Lewis and Thompson (later replaced by Elijah Avery). The group was first recorded at the Memphis Auditorium for Victor Records in January 1928. Hosea Woods joined the Jug Stompers in the late 1920s, playing guitar, banjo and kazoo and providing some vocals. Cannon's Jug Stompers' recording of "Big Railroad Blues" is available on the compilation album The Music Never Stopped: Roots of the Grateful Dead.

Although their last recordings were made in 1930, Cannon's Jug Stompers were one of Beale Street's most popular jug bands through the 1930s. A few songs Cannon recorded with the Jug Stompers are "Minglewood Blues," "Pig Ankle Strut," "Wolf River Blues," "Viola Lee Blues," "White House Station," and "Walk Right In" (a pop hit for The Rooftop Singers in the 1960s and for Dr. Hook in the 1970s). By the end of the 1930s, Cannon had effectively retired, although he occasionally performed as a solo musician.

Cannon made a few recordings for Folkways Records in 1956. During the blues revival of the 1960s, he made some appearances at colleges and coffee houses with Furry Lewis and Bukka White, but he had to pawn his banjo to pay his heating bill the winter before The Rooftop Singers had a hit with "Walk Right In."

In the wake of becoming a hit composer, he recorded an album for Stax Records in 1963, with fellow Memphis musicians Will Shade (the former leader of the Memphis Jug Band) on jug and Milton Roby on washboard. Cannon performed traditional songs, including "Kill It," "Salty Dog," "Going Around," "The Mountain," "Ol' Hen," "Gonna Raise a Ruckus Tonight," "Ain't Gonna Rain No More," "Boll-Weevil," "Come On down to My House," "Make Me a Pallet on Your Floor," "Get Up in the Morning Soon," and "Crawdad Hole," along with his own "Walk Right In," with stories and introductions between songs.

Cannon appeared in the film Hallelujah! (1929), produced by King Vidor, in the late-night wedding scene.

Death
Gus Cannon died in Memphis, Tennessee, on October 15, 1979, and is buried at Greenview Memorial Gardens, Hernando, Mississippi.

Discography

Studio albums
 Walk Right In (Stax, 1963)
 Gus Cannon's Jug Stompers (Roots, 1971)

Compilations
 Cannon's Jug Stompers, The Complete Works in Chronological Order 1927–1930 including Gus Cannon as Banjo Joe (Herwin, 1975)
 Complete Recorded Works in Chronological Order, vols. 1 and 2 (Document, 1990)
 The Legendary 1928–1930 Recordings (JSP, 1994)
 The Best of Cannon's Jug Stompers (Yazoo, 2001)

References

External links

 Illustrated Gus Cannon discography
 Madison Street Rag – Gus Cannon
 Boll Weevil – Gus Cannon
 Minglewood Blues – Gus Cannon and his Jug Stompers
 

1880s births
1979 deaths
Country blues musicians
African-American banjoists
American blues guitarists
American male guitarists
American street performers
People from Marshall County, Mississippi
Paramount Records artists
Stax Records artists
Victor Records artists
Blues musicians from Mississippi
Guitarists from Mississippi
20th-century American guitarists
20th-century American male musicians
African-American guitarists
20th-century African-American musicians